The Inbetweeners Movie, known simply as The Inbetweeners in North America, is a 2011 British coming-of-age teen adventure comedy film based on the E4 sitcom The Inbetweeners, written by series creators Damon Beesley and Iain Morris and directed by Ben Palmer.

The film follows the misadventures of a group of teenage friends on holiday in Malia after the end of their final year at school together, and was intended as an ending to the TV series. It stars Simon Bird, Joe Thomas, James Buckley and Blake Harrison. The Inbetweeners Movie was released on 17 August 2011 in the UK and Ireland by Entertainment Film Distributors, to favourable reviews, although its later release in the United States received mixed reviews from American critics. It was a considerable commercial success, setting the record for the biggest opening weekend for a comedy film in the UK. A sequel, The Inbetweeners 2, was released on 6 August 2014.

Plot
Teenage friends Will McKenzie, Simon Cooper, Jay Cartwright, and Neil Sutherland finish their A-levels and prepare to leave Rudge Park Comprehensive. To celebrate, the boys decide to go on a "lads holiday" together to Malia, Crete. Arriving in the country, the boys find their accommodation to be a rundown hostel, and venture out later to experience the country's nightlife. In the town centre, the boys are tricked by a rep into visiting a deserted bar, and they meet a group of four girls who are holidaying: Alison, Lucy, Lisa, and Jane. While their initial meeting and conversations do not go smoothly—and Alison is already in a relationship with a local Greek waiter called Nicos—the girls arrange to meet the boys again at the girl's hotel the following day. Simon sees his former girlfriend Carli across the street, but is introduced to her new love interest, James, a cocky, arrogant club rep. Carli reveals that she is going to an all-day boat party later in the week before she returns to England, and Simon promises to meet her there.

The next day, the boys meet the girls at their hotel, but after several mishaps involving Jay and Will, they are kicked out. Jay and Simon get into an argument over Simon's obsession with Carli and they briefly fight each other in the street. Desperate to buy a ticket for the boat party to try to reconcile with Carli, Simon naïvely "sells" all of his clothes to James without receiving payment. It is revealed Jay had bought four boat party tickets, but had torn up Simon's after the fight. Jay and Neil go to a club where they encounter James and his friends and try to befriend them, but James verbally abuses the pair, forcing them to leave. That evening, the four boys meet up and reconcile. The girls appear and Will and Alison, Simon and Lucy, and Jay and Jane all grow closer to each other, while Neil disappears with an older woman. The girls suggest that they all go skinny dipping at the local beach. Jay becomes embarrassed when two men laugh at Jane for being overweight, and an upset Jane leaves him. Alison removes Will's glasses as they strip naked. While trying to find them, Will stumbles upon her boyfriend, Nicos, having sex with another woman and Alison leaves, distraught. In the sea, Lucy and Simon prepare to kiss, but Simon sees Carli on the beach and leaves Lucy alone, angering her. With the girls having left, the boys decide to visit various bars and clubs to get drunk.

On the day of the boat party, the group meet the girls again at the beach, where Alison reconciles with Will and gives him Nicos' ticket to join her on the boat. Elsewhere, Simon apologises to Lucy and she offers him her boat party ticket so that he can be with Carli. On board, Simon witnesses an argument between Carli and James. Carli kisses Simon passionately, but he realises that she is just using him to make James jealous; finally seeing Carli for her true colours, he leaves her. Will and Alison admit their feelings toward each other and Jay apologises to Jane and both start a relationship, while Neil and Lisa do the same. Jay and Jane encounter James who mocks Jane's weight and demands a banknote from Jay so that he can snort cocaine. Jay gets revenge on him by giving James a €20 note that was concealed in his anus, leaving James to unknowingly have faeces on his nose. Simon realises that Lucy is more worthy of his attention than Carli, and decides to swim back to shore to her as a romantic gesture; however, he nearly drowns on the way there. As he is taken back to the beach via air ambulance, Lucy kisses him and they reconcile.

During the credits, the four boys and the girls spend the rest of their holiday together as couples. When the holiday ends, upon their return to England, the group say goodbye at Gatwick Airport and the girls are introduced to the boy's parents.

Cast

List of cast members:

 Simon Bird as Will McKenzie
 James Buckley as Jay Cartwright
 Blake Harrison as Neil Sutherland 
 Joe Thomas as Simon Cooper
 Emily Head as Carli D'Amato
 Laura Haddock as Alison
 Tamla Kari as Lucy
 Jessica Knappett as Lisa
 Lydia Rose Bewley as Jane
 Theo James as James
 Theo Barklem-Biggs as Richard
 Anthony Head as Mr. McKenzie
 Belinda Stewart-Wilson as Polly McKenzie
 Martin Trenaman as Alan Cooper
 Robin Weaver as Pamela Cooper
 David Schaal as Terry Cartwright
 Victoria Willing as Mrs Cartwright
 Alex Macqueen as Kevin Sutherland
 Greg Davies as Mr Gilbert
 Henry Lloyd-Hughes as Mark Donovan
 Lauren O'Rourke as Nicole
 David Avery as Nicos
 Cush Jumbo as Jaime
 Storme Toolis as Wheelchair Girl
 Aimee Kelly as Party Girl (uncredited)

Soundtrack
The official soundtrack consists of:

 Miles Kane – "Quicksand"
 Mike Skinner – "No Problemo"
 "Mental Holiday" (from The Inbetweeners) 
 The Vines – "Gimme Love'"
 Ke$ha – "Blow (Cirkut Remix)"
 "Introduce Yourself" (from The Inbetweeners) 
 Yolanda Be Cool – "We No Speak Americano (Radio Edit)"
 Axwell – "Nothing but Love (Radio Edit)"
 Mike Skinner – "Fernando's Theme"
 "You're a Virgin" (from The Inbetweeners) 
 Mike Skinner – "Twenty Euros"
 Mike Skinner – "Waving Not Drowning"
 "He Shoots He Scores" (from The Inbetweeners) 
 Mike Skinner – "Clunge in a Barrel"
 Deer Tick – "Twenty Miles"
 Calvin Harris – "Feel So Close (Benny Benassi Remix)"
 "Smack in the Balls" (from The Inbetweeners)
 Mike Skinner – "We Are Go"
 Everything Everything – "MY KZ, YR BF (Grum Remix)"
 Mike Skinner – "Moanatronic 5000"
 The D.O.T – "Whatever It Takes" 
 "Two Man Job" (from The Inbetweeners) 
 Mike Skinner – "Do It"
 Sean Kingston – "Party All Night (Sleep All Day)"
 Morning Runner – "Gone up in Flames" (The Inbetweeners theme tune) 
 Mike Skinner – "Pussay Patrol"
 "To The Pussay" (from The Inbetweeners)

Songs not on the official soundtrack but featured in the film:
 Demetrios Kousathanas - "Pes to Mou to Nai"
 Pixie Lott – "All About Tonight"
 Plan B – "Stay Too Long"
 Funky G – "Kafana na Balkanu"
 Edward Maya & Mia Martina – "Stereo Love"
 Diana Vickers – "The Boy Who Murdered Love"

Production

A first draft for The Inbetweeners Movie was completed before the third series was even written. The story remained mostly similar besides small changes such as a scene in which Jay hires a motorbike, pretending he knows how to ride it, but failing by crashing into a wall. This scene was removed during the writing process for the third series as the pair needed a humorous way to open the episode and thought the motor bike scene would be better suited to the episode than the movie.

Principal photography took place in the United Kingdom (London, West Sussex), Magaluf, and Malia, Crete. A YouTube video shows the lads walking down the Malia Strip, walking past popular clubs 'Corkers', the strip club 'GoGo Lap Dancing Club' and 'Candy Club'. The Interiors of the empty club where Neil shows off his dance moves were shot in Infernos night club on Clapham High Street, London.

Release

Box office
On its first day of release, The Inbetweeners Movie grossed over £2.5 million in 409 cinemas. The film then went on to set a record for the most successful opening weekend ever achieved by a comedy film in the UK, overtaking Bridget Jones: The Edge of Reason and The Hangover Part II after earning £13.22 million, compared to second-place Rise of the Planet of the Apes which took £2.4 million. The Inbetweeners Movie was confirmed as having the biggest opening weekend for an independent British film. It retained its number 1 position in the UK film charts for four weeks before being overtaken by Tinker Tailor Soldier Spy on 20 September 2011, by which time The Inbetweeners Movie had grossed £41.8 million overall. The film saw a limited theatrical release in the United States on 7 September 2012, where it grossed $36,000 making its total box office revenue $88,025,781.

Critical reception

On review aggregator Rotten Tomatoes, the film has an approval rating of 53% based on 51 reviews, with an average rating of 5.3/10. The website's critical consensus reads, "It arguably plays most strongly to fans of the British series, but even viewers who have never seen The Inbetweeners on TV may find themselves won over by the film's surprisingly tender ribaldry." On Metacritic, the film has a weighted average score of 44 out of 100, based on 17 critics, indicating "mixed or average reviews". Ian Freer of Empire gave the film four stars out of five, observing that "Like any holiday, it is episodic and suffers from repetition but this is gag-for-gag the funniest film of the summer and a fitting end to a much-loved series." Steve Rose of The Guardian gave the film three stars out of five, giving particular praise to Simon Bird's performance and arguing that the film "updates the teen summer holiday formula surprisingly entertainingly, considering it doesn't subvert its one iota and the formula was already done previously with Holiday on the Buses and Kevin & Perry Go Large among others." Tim Robey of The Daily Telegraph also gave a positive assessment of the film, praising it as "an enormous hit, a Mamma Mia! for the Hangover demographic." Screen Daily, on the other hand, gave a mixed review, praising the performances of the main cast and proclaiming the film "Britain’s delayed riposte to American Pie", yet simultaneously arguing that it "can't quite shake off its TV roots, and plot-wise, this is nothing the Greek tourist board would want to advertise." Australian critic Margaret Pomeranz from At the Movies called the characters "gormless" and said, "I'm giving this one star really generously." She also said that the style of humour in the film was the reason that the British Empire collapsed.

Home media
On 12 December 2011, The Inbetweeners Movie was released on DVD and Blu-ray Disc in the UK by 4DVD, with the latter version sold as a triple pack containing both formats along with a digital copy of the film. Both versions include a number of special features, such as a making-of documentary, footage from the film's London premiere, various deleted scenes, cast commentaries and a blooper reel.

Following its appearance in UK stores, the DVD quickly became a major financial success. Within less than a week, the film became the third fastest-selling British home media release of 2011 after Harry Potter and the Deathly Hallows – Part 1 and Harry Potter and the Deathly Hallows – Part 2, with approximately 575,000 copies sold in the first day of its release. By 17 December, estimated sales reached one million, resulting in the film displacing the home media release of Paul as one of the five best-selling DVDs of the year in the UK.

In December 2014, parallel with the release of the film's sequel, a special edition with both films was released on DVD.

Extended version
The Blu-ray release also features an extended cut of the film that restores approximately four minutes of material omitted from the theatrical release, most notably an additional scene in which Will and Simon encounter a drunken Mr. Gilbert on a Malia stag weekend.

Sequel

A sequel to the film, titled The Inbetweeners 2, was released in British and Irish cinemas on 6 August 2014. It is set in Australia.

See also
 List of films based on British sitcoms
 List of 2011 box office number-one films in the United Kingdom

References

External links
 
 
 
 
 

Inbetweeners Movie
2011 films
2010s buddy films
2010s coming-of-age comedy films
2010s teen comedy films
British buddy films
British coming-of-age comedy films
British independent films
British teen comedy films
Films about vacationing
Films about virginity
Films based on television series
Films set in Crete
Films shot in London
Films shot in Spain
Films shot in Greece
Films shot in Crete
Film4 Productions films
2011 comedy films
2010s English-language films
Films directed by Ben Palmer
2010s British films